Kallaj (also Romanized as Kallaj, Kalaj, and Kalladzh) is a village in Khandan Rural District, Tarom Sofla District, Qazvin County, Qazvin Province, Iran. At the 2006 census, its population was 1,517, in 425 families.

References 

Populated places in Qazvin County